"A Chip in the Sugar" is a dramatic monologue written by Alan Bennett in 1987 for television, as part of his Talking Heads series for the BBC. The series became very popular, moving onto BBC Radio, international theatre, becoming one of the best-selling audio book releases of all time and included as part of both the A-level and English syllabus. It was the first episode of the first series of Talking Heads and the only one which featured Alan Bennett as an actor.

Storyline 
Middle-aged Graham Whittaker, a repressed homosexual with a history of mental health issues, finds life becoming complicated as his mother or "Mam", Vera Whittaker, with whom he still lives, reunites with an old flame named Frank Turnbull. Graham becomes increasingly disturbed when Frank, whose outspoken and right-wing opinions conflict with Graham's muddled liberalism, becomes an ever-increasing influence on Vera, taking her to a "common" café at which Graham notices a chip in the sugar bowl. After a brief courtship, Frank proposes to Vera. It is suggested Graham move out of his childhood home and into a hostel. Frank is hiding a secret: he is already married and, despite this, has already proposed to various women before Vera. When Graham finds out, he is vastly relieved and triumphantly confronts his mother with the information. Her hopes of happiness are destroyed, but a safe, stultifying "normality" has been restored in the existence of Graham and his mother.

Reception
Many have praised Bennett's portrayal of the character of Graham. For his performance in the episode, Bennett received a Best Actor nomination at the 1989 BAFTA Awards.

References

External links
Episode details

BBC television dramas
British plays
BBC Radio 7 (rebranded) programmes